Zevegiin Düvchin (born 7 February 1955) is a Mongolian wrestler. He competed at the 1976 Summer Olympics, the 1980 Summer Olympics and the 1988 Summer Olympics.

References

External links
 

1955 births
Living people
Mongolian male sport wrestlers
Olympic wrestlers of Mongolia
Wrestlers at the 1976 Summer Olympics
Wrestlers at the 1980 Summer Olympics
Wrestlers at the 1988 Summer Olympics
People from Övörkhangai Province
Asian Games gold medalists for Mongolia
Asian Games medalists in wrestling
Wrestlers at the 1982 Asian Games
Medalists at the 1982 Asian Games
Universiade medalists in wrestling
Universiade gold medalists for Mongolia
Medalists at the 1977 Summer Universiade
20th-century Mongolian people
21st-century Mongolian people